Palakkal is a suburb of Thrissur district in the state of Kerala located in south India. It is about 6 km from Thrissur City. The main center of Palakkal is Palakkal market stop, where the St.Mathews church is situated.  It is on the route between Thrissur and Kodungallur.

Cities and towns in Thrissur district